James Austin Connolly (March 8, 1843 – December 15, 1914) was a U.S. Representative from Illinois.

Biography
James A. Connolly was born in Newark, New Jersey on March 8, 1843, into a family of Irish descent. He moved to Chesterville, Ohio, with his parents in 1850. He attended the common schools and Selby Academy, Chesterville. He served as assistant clerk of the State Senate in 1858 and 1859. He studied law. He was admitted to the bar in 1859 and practiced in Mount Gilead, Ohio. He moved to Charleston, Illinois, in 1861, where he was admitted to the bar.

After the outbreak of the American Civil War, Connolly enlisted in the Union Army as a private in the One Hundred and Twenty-third Regiment, Illinois Volunteer Infantry, in 1862 and was afterwards captain, major, and brevet lieutenant colonel.

Connolly served as member of the State house of representatives 1872-1876, after which he was appointed the United States attorney for the southern district of Illinois, serving from 1876–1885 and again from 1889–1893. He ran unsuccessfully for election in 1886 to the Fiftieth Congress. He was again nominated in 1888 but declined to run.

Connolly was elected as a Republican to the Fifty-fourth and Fifty-fifth Congresses (March 4, 1895 – March 3, 1899). He was not a candidate for renomination in 1898. He resumed the practice of law in Springfield, Illinois, where he died December 15, 1914. He was interred in Oak Ridge Cemetery.

Notes

References

1843 births
1914 deaths
American people of Irish descent
Politicians from Newark, New Jersey
People from Morrow County, Ohio
Ohio lawyers
Politicians from Springfield, Illinois
Illinois lawyers
Union Army officers
People of Illinois in the American Civil War
Republican Party members of the Illinois House of Representatives
United States Attorneys for the Southern District of Illinois
Burials at Oak Ridge Cemetery
Republican Party members of the United States House of Representatives from Illinois
19th-century American politicians
Lawyers from Newark, New Jersey
People from Charleston, Illinois
19th-century American lawyers
Military personnel from New Jersey